Unter den Linden ("under the linden trees") is a boulevard in the central Mitte district of Berlin, the capital of Germany. Running from the City Palace to Brandenburg Gate, it is named after the linden (lime in England and Ireland, not related to citrus lime) trees that line the grassed pedestrian mall on the median and the two broad carriageways. The avenue links numerous Berlin sights, landmarks and rivers for sightseeing.

Overview

Unter den Linden runs east–west from the site of the  Stadtschloss royal palace (main residence of the House of Hohenzollern) at the Lustgarten park, where the demolished Palace of the Republic once stood, to Pariser Platz and Brandenburg Gate. Eastward the boulevard crosses the Spree river at Berlin Cathedral and continues as Karl-Liebknecht-Straße. The western continuation behind Brandenburg Gate is Straße des 17. Juni. Major north–south streets crossing Unter den Linden are Friedrichstraße and Wilhelmstrasse.

Unter den Linden, which sits at the heart of the historic section of Berlin, developed from a bridle path laid out by Elector John George of Brandenburg in the 16th century to reach his hunting grounds in the Tiergarten. It was replaced by a boulevard of linden trees around present-day Bebelplatz was integrated into the fortification of Berlin in the aftermath of the Thirty Years' War, visible until today as there are no trees.

By the 19th century, as Berlin grew and expanded to the west, Unter den Linden became the most renowned and grandest street in Berlin. In 1851 the famous equestrian statue of Frederick the Great, designed by Christian Daniel Rauch, was erected on the central strip. Johann Strauss III wrote the waltz "Unter den Linden" in 1900. In the course of the building of the Nord-Süd-Tunnel for the Berlin S-Bahn in 1934–35, most of the linden trees were cut down and during the last days of World War II the remaining trees were destroyed or cut down for firewood. The present-day linden were replanted in the 1950s.

Points of interest

Since 1937, the numbering of the properties on the street has started at the Schlossbrücke (Palace Bridge), which connects Unter den Linden with the Lustgarten and Museum Island. The reconstructed Alte Kommandantur is at No. 1, standing opposite the Zeughaus arsenal, the oldest building on Unter den Linden, built between 1695 and 1706, now the seat of the Deutsches Historisches Museum, No. 2. Buildings along the street include (from east to west) the Crown Prince's Palace (the former palace of the Hohenzollern crown princes), at No. 3, opposite the Neue Wache war memorial, No. 4,  Karl Friedrich Schinkel’s masterpiece built in 1817. Further along, on Bebelplatz, the Berlin State Opera, No. 7, colloquially called Lindenoper, St. Hedwig's Cathedral and the Altes Palais, No. 9, (Old Palace, Berlin) a favorite Neoclassical residence of Emperor Wilhelm I; next, on the north side lies the main building of the Humboldt University, No. 6, and House I of the Berlin State Library, No. 8.  At the western end are the Russian Embassy (former Soviet Embassy, Nos. 63-65, the Hungarian Embassy, No. 76, standing at the junction with Wilhelmstrasse, and finally the Hotel Adlon, No. 77, at the corner of Pariser Platz, which has been completely rebuilt on the site of the pre-war hotel. Well-known statues of Alexander and Wilhelm von Humboldt in front of the university as well as of the Prussian generals Scharnhorst and Bülow, also adorn the street.
A street sign carrying the name Unter den Linden dating from before the 1930s was taken away by British forces and can now be seen at the Imperial War Museum, London.

Along Unter den Linden

See also
Berlin Brandenburger Tor station – formerly Berlin Unter den Linden
Berlin Unter den Linden station – U-Bahn station at the Friedrichstraße intersection, served by U5 and U6 trains.

External links

 Unter den Linden - Interactive 360° Panorama
 Webcam: Live-View of the street Unter den Linden with Brandenburg Gate in Berlin, Germany

Streets in Berlin
Boulevards
Mitte
Prussian cultural sites
Articles containing video clips